Đorđe Vukadinović (born 23 October 1962) is a Serbian philosopher, political analyst and journalist.

Biography
Vukadinović was born in Sombor on 23 October 1962. He graduated from the University of Belgrade Faculty of Philosophy in 1987. After that, he was a teacher of philosophy at the Gymnasium of Karlovci for some time. Since 1990, he lectures at the University of Belgrade Faculty of Philosophy on the courses "Introduction to the social theory" and "philosophy of politics". He wrote several dozen scientific papers on the topics of classical and modern German philosophy, philosophy of history and philosophy of politics. He wrote columns for many newspapers and journals including Politika and NIN.

Vukadinović has three published books: Između dve vatre (2007), Od nemila do nedraga (2008) and Pompeja na Balkanu (2012).

He is the founder and editor-in-chief of the conservative political magazine Nova srpska politička misao.

Vukadinović was an MP in Assembly of Serbia from 2016 to 2020. He was elected in the 2016 election as part of the Democratic Party of Serbia/Dveri list, but left the group in late 2016 to join the newly formed Za spas Srbije parliamentary group. Since 2020, he is an independent member of United Opposition of Serbia.

Vukadinović publicly espouses conservative, eurosceptic and pro-Russian views. On 21 May 2022, National Security and Defense Council of Ukraine accused Vukadinović of spreading Russian propaganda.

Works
 Između dve vatre, 2007
 Od nemila do nedraga, 2008
 Pompeja na Balkanu, 2012

References 

1962 births
Living people
Politicians from Sombor
Writers from Sombor
Serbian journalists
Serbian columnists
Serbian political philosophers
Serbian magazine editors
Magazine publishers (people)
Academic staff of the University of Belgrade
20th-century Serbian philosophers
21st-century Serbian philosophers